Citistore (Hong Kong) Limited or Citistore is a department store company in Hong Kong. It is a wholly owned subsidiary of Henderson Land Development, a flagship enterprise owned by Dr. Lee Shau Kee. Established in 1989, it has branches in Tsuen Wan, Yuen Long, Ma On Shan, Tseung Kwan O and Tai Kok Tsui, and two "id:c" where is a new domain for young generation. The main customers of Citistore are young people in middle income group.

While Henderson Land Development Co. witnessed a gain of 1.9 percent on Sep 2014. The company has plans of selling the Citistore retail franchise.

References

External links

Citistore

Retail companies established in 1989
Department stores of Hong Kong
Henderson Land Development